Avard Longley (February 22, 1823 – February 22, 1884) was a farmer, merchant and politician in Nova Scotia, Canada. He represented Annapolis County in the Nova Scotia House of Assembly from 1859 to 1867 and again from 1874 to 1878 and represented Annapolis in the House of Commons of Canada from 1878 to 1882 as a Conservative member.

He was born in Paradise, Nova Scotia, the son of Asaph Longley and Dorcas Poole. In 1848, he married Hannah Maria Whitman. Longley married Charlotte Augusta Troop in 1855. Longley was first elected to the assembly in 1859 as a temperance advocate. He was commissioner of railways from 1864 to 1869. Longley helped found the Nova Scotia Fruit Growers' Association and served as its president from 1883 to 1884. He ran unsuccessfully for a federal seat in 1867 and 1872 and was defeated when he ran for a seat in the provincial assembly in 1871. Longley served on the board of governors for Acadia College from 1874 to 1884. Still a temperance advocate, while in Ottawa, he attempted to have the bar in the House of Commons closed permanently. Longley did not run for reelection in 1882 due to poor health. He died in Paradise at the age of 61.

Election results

References 

Biography at the Dictionary of Canadian Biography Online

1823 births
1884 deaths
Progressive Conservative Association of Nova Scotia MLAs
Canadian Baptists
Members of the House of Commons of Canada from Nova Scotia
Conservative Party of Canada (1867–1942) MPs
19th-century Baptists